Roger Sharpley (17 May 1929 – February 1999) was a British rower. He competed in the men's eight event at the 1952 Summer Olympics.

References

1929 births
1999 deaths
British male rowers
Olympic rowers of Great Britain
Rowers at the 1952 Summer Olympics
People from Shipston-on-Stour